Tazarene was an ancient town of Drangiana in southwest Afghanistan. It is located above Alexandria of the Caucasus on the Etymandrus river.

References
 Classical Gazetteer

Ancient history of Afghanistan